Diamonds is a musical revue  about baseball. The book and music were created by many writers, composers, and lyricists. Among them were Ellen Fitzhugh, Roy Blount, Jr., and John Weidman (book); and Larry Grossman, Comden and Green, Howard Ashman, and Cy Coleman, music.

The musical ran Off Broadway at the Circle in the Square Downtown theater, beginning on December 16, 1984, and closing on March 31, 1985, after 122 performances.  The production was directed by Broadway veteran Harold Prince. The cast included Loni Ackerman, Susan Bigelow, Jackée Harry, Scott Holmes, Dick Latessa, Dwayne Markee, Wade Raley, Larry Riley, Nestor Serrano, Gordon Stanley and Chip Zien.

The musical won the Outer Critics Circle Award for Best Set Design, by Tony Straiges.

Songs
 Winter In New York (music: John Kander, lyrics: Fred Ebb)
 In The Cards (music: Alan Menken, lyrics: David Zippel)
 Favorite Sons (music: Larry Grossman, lyrics: Ellen Fitzhugh)
 Song for a Pinch Hitter (music: Larry Grossman, lyrics: Ellen Fitzhugh)
 Vendors (music: Cy Coleman, lyrics: Betty Comden and Adolph Green)
 What You'd Call a Dream (music and lyrics: Craig Carnelia)
 Escorte-Moi (music and lyrics: Albert Von Tilzer and Jack Norworth)
 He Threw Out The Ball (music: Larry Grossman, lyrics: Ellen Fitzhugh)
 Hundreds of Hats (music: Jonathan Sheffer, lyrics: Howard Ashman)
 1919 (music and lyrics: Jim Wann)
 Let's Play Ball (music and lyrics: Gerard Alessandrini)
 Vendors #2 (music: Cy Coleman, lyrics: Betty Comden and Adolph Green)
 The Boys of Summer (music: Larry Grossman, lyrics: Ellen Fitzhugh)
 Song for a Hunter College Graduate (music: Jonathan Sheffer, lyrics: Howard Ashman)
 Stay in Your Own Back Yard (music: Lyn Udall, lyrics: Karl Kennett, additional music: Pam Drews)
 Ka-Razy (music: Doug Katsaros, lyrics: David Zippel)
 Diamonds Are Forever (music: John Kander, lyrics: Fred Ebb)

Critical response
The Los Angeles Times quoted several reviews of the piece. "Is it a hit ? Will it have a run ? Frank Rich of the New York Times didn't particularly think so. Clive Barnes of the New York Post definitely thought not: 'A fiasco of the smallest, dullest kind. Say it ain't so, Hal.' But the Daily News Doug Watt thought the show had some cute ideas, such as its Kabuki-style rendering of 'Casey at the Bat.' His final verdict: 'Call 'Diamonds' a Little League homer and let it go at that.'"

References

External links
Internet Off-Broadway Database listing

1984 musicals
Off-Broadway musicals
Revues